Isturgia spodiaria is a moth of the family Geometridae. It was described by A. Lefèvre in 1832. It is found in Spain, Malta and North Africa.

The wingspan is 28–30 mm.

References

 "Isturgia spodiaria (Lefebvre, 1832)". Insecta.pro. Retrieved February 5, 2020.

Moths described in 1832
Macariini